Sarkis Elgkian (born 24 March 1972) is a retired Armenian-Greek Greco Roman wrestler. He competed at the 1996 Summer Olympics, where he came in 7th place.

References

External links
 

1972 births
Living people
Armenian wrestlers
Greek male sport wrestlers
Wrestlers at the 1996 Summer Olympics
Olympic wrestlers of Greece
Greek people of Armenian descent